A list of films produced by the Israeli film industry released in 2012.

Announced/Unscheduled releases

Notable deaths

 December 9 – Anat Gov (born 1953), Israeli playwright and scriptwriter.
 December 16 – Avraham Mor (born 1938), Israeli actor

See also
2012 in Israel

References

External links
 Israeli films of 2012 at the Internet Movie Database



Israeli
Film
2012